The R-class was a class of eight trams built by James Moore & Sons and the Melbourne & Metropolitan Tramways Board (MMTB). The Fitzroy, Northcote & Preston Tramways Trust (FNPTT) placed five trams in service in 1920. All passed to the MMTB on 2 February 1920 when it took over the FNPTT becoming the R-class and being renumbered 172-176.

In 1936, 152 and 153 were sold for further use on the Ballarat and Bendigo networks respectively. Numbers 151, 174-176 were rebuilt to operate all night services in 1937 and in this role travelled across the network. They were withdrawn after all night services ceased in 1957.

References

Melbourne tram vehicles
600 V DC multiple units